Jan Van Houdt from the IMEC, Leuven, Belgium was named Fellow of the Institute of Electrical and Electronics Engineers (IEEE) in 2014 for contributions to flash memory devices.

References 

Fellow Members of the IEEE
Living people
Year of birth missing (living people)